The 1930 Mestaruussarja season was the first completed season of Finnish Football Championship played in a league format, known locally as the Mestaruussarja, ‘Championship Series’. Prior to this, from 1908 to 1929, the championship had been decided in a cup competition, which was NOT called the Finnish Cup.

Overview
The 1930 Mestaruussarja  was contested by 8 teams, with HIFK Helsinki claiming the inaugural championship, which was also known as the A-sarja, by winning a tiebreaker match with the scoreline of 4–1 over TPS Turku. Stjärnan Helsinki and ÅIFK Turku were relegated to the second tier, which was known as the B-sarja.

Participating clubs 

In 1930, there were 8 participants in the Mestaruussarja:

 ÅIFK Turku 
 HIFK Helsinki 
 HPS Helsinki 
 KIF Helsinki 
 Stjärnan Helsinki 
 TPS Turku 
 ViPS Viipuri 
 VPS Vaasa

League table

Results

Members of the HIFK champions’ team
Charles Holmberg; Frans Karjagin, Gösta Lesch; Alfons Nylund, Torsten Lindholm, Axel Lindbäck; Gunnar Åström, Jarl Malmgren, Torsten Svanström, Holger Salin, Ragnar Lindbäck.

Footnotes

References
 Jalkapallon pikkujättiläinen (‘The Little Giant Book of Finnish Football’).

Mestaruussarja seasons
Fin
1